is a 1968 Japanese drama film directed by Masaki Kobayashi.

Cast
 Michiyo Aratama as Yoshiko
 Makoto Fujita
 Toshio Kurosawa as Zensaku's son
 Tomoko Naraoka as Zensaku's wife
 Wakako Sakai
 Kei Satō as Suzuki

Release
Hymn to a Tired Man was released theatrically in Japan on 8 June 1968 where it was distributed by Toho. The film was released theatrically in the United States by Toho International with English subtitles. It was entered into the 1969 Cannes Film Festival.

References

Sources

External links

1968 films
1968 drama films
Japanese black-and-white films
Japanese drama films
1960s Japanese-language films
Films based on works by Shūsaku Endō
Films directed by Masaki Kobayashi
Toho films
1960s Japanese films